Der Rosenkavalier may refer to:

 Der Rosenkavalier, an opera by Richard Strauss
 Der Rosenkavalier (1926 film), an Austrian film adaptation directed by Robert Wiene
 Der Rosenkavalier (1962 film), a British film adaptation directed by Paul Czinner